PKP Polskie Linie Kolejowe S.A. is the Polish railway infrastructure manager, responsible for maintenance of rail tracks, conducting the trains across the country, scheduling train timetables, and management of railway land.

The company was founded in 2001 as part of the split-up of the once-unitary Polish State Railways JSC, to separate infrastructure management and transport operations.

References

See also 
 Transportation in Poland
 List of railway companies
 Polish locomotives designation
 PKP Group

PKP Group companies
Railway companies of Poland
Railway infrastructure managers